RoboCop versus Terminator may refer to:

 RoboCop Versus The Terminator, a 1993 video game based on the RoboCop and Terminator franchises, and loosely based on:
 RoboCop Versus The Terminator (comics), a 1992 four-issue comic book crossover limited series written by Frank Miller and published by Dark Horse Comics
 Terminator vs. RoboCop, the 9th episode of the 4th season of the YouTube series Epic Rap Battles of History